Dachny (masculine), Dachnaya (feminine), or Dachnoye (neuter) may refer to:
Dachny (rural locality) (Dachnaya, Dachnoye), several rural localities in Russia
, a municipal okrug in Kirovsky District of the federal city of St. Petersburg, Russia
Dachnoye metro station, a temporary station of the Leningrad Metropolitan in service between 1966 and 1977
Dachne (disambiguation) (Dachnoye), several inhabited localities in Ukraine